Jack Jung-Kai Yang (born 1974) is an American/Canadian actor of Taiwanese ethnicity. He was born in Toronto, Ontario, Canada and currently resides in Los Angeles, California.

Filmography
 The Yellow Truth as Jack (2003)
 Shadow Chaser (2003)
 Law & Order: Special Victims Unit as Ricky Yao (2004)
 Skin Trade (short film) as The Designer (2004)
 The Seat Filler as Page (2004)
 CSI: Miami as Shawn Kimsey (2005)
 All of Us as Harry (2005)
 Grey's Anatomy as Walter (2005-2007)
 Nip/Tuck as Chiyo (2006)
 The Evidence as Ha Huang (2006)
 Scrubs as Patient (2006)
 ER as Bevan Wong (2007)
 Seven Pounds as Apogee Engineer (2008)
 Need for Speed: Undercover (video game) as Chau Wu (2008)
 Command & Conquer: Red Alert 3 (video game) as Commander Kenji Tenzai (2008)
 Samurai Girl as Hiko (2008)
 The Mummy: Tomb of the Dragon Emperor (video game) as General Yang (2008)
 Cashmere Mafia as Jason Chung (2008)
 Knight Rider as Cross (2008)
 Chuck as Jason Wang (2009)
 Command & Conquer: Red Alert 3 – Uprising (video game) as Commander Kenji Tenzai (2009)
 Point of Entry Season 4 as Glenn Chua (2013)
 A Leading Man as GQ (2013)
 American Ultra as Gangster (2015)
 Star as Elliot (2017)
 Lucifer (season 3 episode 6) as police inspector (2017)
 Justice League (2017) as Garrett Bowman
 Shadowhunters as Asmodeus (2018–2019)

References

External links
 

American male film actors
American male television actors
American male voice actors
Living people
American people of Taiwanese descent
Canadian people of Taiwanese descent
American male actors of Taiwanese descent
Canadian male actors of Taiwanese descent
Place of birth missing (living people)
1974 births
Canadian male film actors
Canadian male television actors
Canadian male voice actors